Vangapandu Usha is a Telugu-language balladeer. She is cultural wing convenor of YSR Congress party. She is popular for her folk songs and dance. AP State Government recently appointed her as a Chairperson for AP State Creativity and Culture Commission.

Life
She was born to popular balladeer, poet and activist Vangapandu Prasada Rao.

She was active among left-wing organizations but has joined YSR Congress party in 2011.

References

Living people
YSR Congress Party politicians
Women in Andhra Pradesh politics
Year of birth missing (living people)
Indian women singer-songwriters
Indian singer-songwriters
Indian women folk singers
Indian folk singers
Singers from Andhra Pradesh
21st-century Indian women politicians
21st-century Indian politicians
21st-century Indian women singers
21st-century Indian singers
Women musicians from Andhra Pradesh
20th-century Indian women singers
20th-century Indian singers